St. Lucie County is a county located in the southeastern portion of the U.S. state of Florida. As of the 2020 census, the population was 329,226. The county's seat is Fort Pierce. St. Lucie County is included in the Port St. Lucie, FL Metropolitan Statistical Area.

History
The area was originally inhabited by the Ais tribe, a hunter-gatherer culture whose territory extended from south of the St. John's river to the St. Lucie Inlet. Spanish explorers frequently encountered the fierce tribe as the Spanish treasure routes ran parallel in order to take advantage of the strong Gulfstream current. The area was given several names by the Spanish including Rio de Ays (later changed to Indian River) as well as Santa Lucia, named after the short-lived late 16th-century Spanish fort that bore its name farther south. The fabled 1715 Spanish treasure fleet sank off the area that is now St. Lucie County, leading to the regional naming of the area as the Treasure Coast.

During the early 19th century, the Spanish government issued several land grants in the area, one of which went to settler James Hutchinson. The grant contained  and today the barrier island Hutchinson Island still retains his name. During the mid-1800s, Seminoles and runaway slaves sought refuge in the virtually uninhabited area. By 1837 the Second Seminole war had broken out in Florida. In December 1837, a group of soldiers under the command of Lt. Colonel Benjamin K. Pierce sailed down the Indian River and established a fort, naming it after their commander. Today the county seat of St. Lucie County is still known as Fort Pierce. In 1841, the United States government began issuing land grants under the Armed Occupation Act to Americans who were willing to settle the area. Several of these grants were within the boundaries of today's St. Lucie County. The Third Seminole War in 1851 saw the building of a second major American fort in the area, Fort Capron, located in the area that is today's St. Lucie Village.

From this point on the area became gradually more populated as settlers ventured down for health and economic reasons. The Flagler railroad reached the area in the 1890s. Major industries at the end of the 19th century in the area included pineapple, fishing and seafood canning and cattle. Citrus would not become a major crop until the early 1900s. The city of Fort Pierce was chartered in 1901.

Up until 1905 the area had been under Brevard County (although Brevard County had been named St. Lucie County from 1844 until 1855 when it was renamed Brevard County). During the summer of 1905, St. Lucie County was created from the southern part of Brevard County with the county seat being at Fort Pierce. Other settlements at the time in St. Lucie County's boundaries included Jensen, Eden, Anknona, Walton, Eldred, White City, Viking, St. Lucie, Oslo, Vero, Quay, Sebastian and others. In 1925, Indian River County was created out of the northern part of St. Lucie County, while Martin County was created from a small part of southeastern St. Lucie County and the northern part of Palm Beach County during that same year. Much of western St Lucie County had already gone in 1917 to form Okeechobee County.

The 1920s saw increased land speculation and planned developments such as Indrio and San Lucie that never came to fruition due to the bust in 1929. During World War II the United States Naval Amphibious Training Base was established in Fort Pierce on North and South Hutchinson Island. During its operation over 140,000 troops were processed through the base. The post-war years saw a major population boom in the area, some of which were returning sailors and their families that had undergone training at the Navy base.

In 1958, the General Development Corporation, a subsidiary of Mackle Brothers, bought tens of thousands of acres of land along the St. Lucie River in the southern part of the county in order to build a new community. Colorful and clever advertising soon drew thousands of northeastern retirees and families to the area, laying the foundation for the future city of Port St. Lucie. Population and building booms in the late 20th century led to the formation of other areas west and south of Port St. Lucie including St. Lucie West and the new master planned community of Tradition. The early 21st century brought many trials for the county including two major hurricanes in 2004 and an economic and housing slump starting in 2008. In 2005, St. Lucie County celebrated its 100th birthday.

Geography

Adjacent counties
 Indian River County - north
 Martin County - south
 Okeechobee County - west

Transportation

Airports
 St. Lucie County International Airport, a general aviation airport. The nearest commercial airports are in Melbourne, Vero Beach, and West Palm Beach.

Major highways

  Interstate 95
  U.S. Highway 1
  State Road 716
  State Road 70
  State Road 68
  State Road 615
  State Road 614
  Florida's Turnpike
  State Road A1A
  State Road 608
  State Road 607
  State Road 713

Public bus service
St. Lucie County is served by the St. Lucie Transportation Planning Organization (TPO). The TPO is a Metropolitan Planning Organization (MPO), a federally mandated and federally funded transportation policy-making organization responsible for transportation planning, programming, and financing of State and Federal Transportation Funds for St. Lucie County. The TPO is governed by a TPO Board, which is composed of elected officials, representatives from the St. Lucie County School Board, and representatives from Community Transit, a division of The Council on Aging of St. Lucie, Inc. The original bus system started out as a demand response service bus in the 1990s, it only served St. Lucie County. Soon it expanded to a fixed route system, going to predetermined locations along a route. On June 3, 2002, the Florida Department of Transportation (FDOT) approved funding, expanding the bus service to Martin County, and became the Treasure Coast Connector.

Passenger trains
Until 1968 the Florida East Coast Railway operated Jacksonville to Miami service, with station stops in Fort Pierce and Jensen Beach. Until 1963 long distances passenger trains of the Illinois Central (City of Miami) and Louisville and Nashville (Dixie Flagler and South Wind) from Chicago and Atlantic Coast Line from New York City (East Coast Champion, the Havana Special, and the winter-only Florida Special) made stops in Fort Pierce.

The Brightline passenger rail company is extending to the Space Coast and Orlando, north from the West Palm Beach terminus of its West Palm Beach - Miami service. Fort Pierce and nearby Stuart have been jockeying for position as the Treasure Coast station for a return of passenger service, with Stuart edging out ahead.

Demographics

As of the 2020 United States census, there were 329,226 people, 118,527 households, and 81,648 families residing in the county.

As of the census of 2010, there were 277,789 people, 108,523 households, and 74,963 families residing in the county.  The population density was 485.7 people per square mile.  There were 137,029 housing units at an average density of 239.6 per square mile.  The racial makeup of the county was 71.8% White, 19.1% African American, 0.4% Native American, 1.6% Asian, 0.1% Pacific Islander, 4.5% from other races, and 2.6% from two or more races. Hispanic or Latino of any race were 16.6% of the population.

According to the 2015 American Community Survey, 90.7% spoke  English, 14.6% Spanish, 5.0% Other Indo-European languages, and 1.2% Asian and Pacific Island languages.

According to census of 2000, the largest ancestry groups in St. Lucie County were: English 34%, African 15%, Irish 14%, German 13%, Italian 10%.  For every 100 females, there were 95.50 males.  For every 100 females age 18 and over, there were 92.80 males.

In 2010 there were 108,523 households, out of which 26.30% had children under the age of 18 living with them, 51.0% were married couples living together, 12.9% had a female householder with   no husband present, and 30.9% were non-families. 24.2% of all non-family households were made up of individuals living alone, and 11.7% had someone living alone who was 65 years of age or older.  The average household size was 2.53 and the average family size was 2.99.

In the county, the population was spread out, with 77.7% 18 years of age and over; 23.2% from 25 to 44, 26.8% from 45 to 64, and 19.9% who were 65 years of age or older.  The median age was 42.4 years.

According to the 2010 census, the median income for a household in the county was $36,363, and the median income for a family was $41,381. Males had a median income of $30,047 versus $22,684 for females. The per capita income for the county was $18,790.  About 9.60% of families and 13.40% of the population were below the poverty line, including 20.50% of those under age 18 and 7.70% of those age 65 or over.

Fauna 
Six bird species in St. Lucie County are listed as "highly vulnerable" to climate change:
 Red-headed woodpecker
 Gray kingbird
 Fish crow
 Brown thrasher
 Eastern towhee
 Boat-tailed grackle

Politics
According to St. Lucie County Supervisor of Elections website, registered voters as of September 10, 2020, totaled 217,666: Democratic 85,714, Republican 72,554, NPA 56,500, Other 2,898. St. Lucie County has favored the Democratic Party in recent decades, but in 2016 and 2020, it voted for Republican Party candidate Donald Trump.

Education
Schools in the county are managed by St. Lucie County Public Schools.
 Florida Atlantic University Harbor Branch Oceanographic Institute 
 Indian River State College Ft. Pierce and PSL Campus
 Keiser University PSL Campus
 University of Florida Institute of Food and Agricultural Sciences, Ft. Pierce

Libraries
St. Lucie County is served by the St. Lucie County Library System.

Points of interest

 Experimental Oculina Research Reserve
 Heathcote Botanical Gardens
 Navy UDT-SEAL Museum (Fort Pierce was the original home of the Navy SEALs)
 Old Fort Park
 St. Lucie County Aquarium
 St. Lucie County International Airport
 St. Lucie County Regional History Center

Communities

Cities
 Fort Pierce
 Port St. Lucie

Towns
 St. Lucie Village

Census designated places
 Fort Pierce North
 Fort Pierce South
Hutchinson Island South
 Indian River Estates
 Lakewood Park
 River Park
 White City

Unincorporated communities
 Viking

See also
 National Register of Historic Places listings in St. Lucie County, Florida

Notes

References

External links

Governmental
 Board of County Commissioners
 St. Lucie County Board of County Commissioners
 Town & City Web Sites
 City of Ft. Pierce Official Web Site
 City of Port St. Lucie Official Web Site
 Town of St. Lucie Village Official Web Site
 Constitutional officers
 St. Lucie County Clerk
 St. Lucie County Supervisor of Elections
 St. Lucie County Property Appraiser
 St. Lucie County Sheriff's Office
 St. Lucie County Tax Collector
 Countywide districts
 St. Lucie County School District
 St. Lucie Soil and Water Conservation District
 Multicounty districts
 Indian River Community College
 South Florida Water Management District
 Treasure Coast Regional Planning Council
 Judicial branch
 St. Lucie County Clerk of Courts
  Public Defender, 19th Judicial Circuit of Florida
  State Attorney, 19th Judicial Circuit of Florida
  Circuit and County Courts for the 19th Judicial Circuit of Florida

Nongovernmental

 St. Lucie County Tourism Web Site

 
Saint Lucie County, Florida
Port St. Lucie metropolitan area
1905 establishments in Florida
Populated places established in 1905